WLFG (channel 68) is a religious independent station licensed to Grundy, Virginia, United States, serving the Tri-Cities area of southwestern Virginia and northeastern Tennessee. The station is owned by Abingdon, Virginia–based Living Faith Television. WLFG's transmitters are located near Hansonville, Virginia and Harlan, Kentucky.

The station's programming is relayed on two satellite stations: WAGV (channel 68) in Harlan (which shares transmitter facilities with WLFG) and WLFB (channel 40) in Bluefield, West Virginia (with transmitter atop East River Mountain, south of Bluefield, Virginia). WAGV was the first to broadcast exclusively in digital following a malfunction at its analog transmitter.

History
Living Faith Television was founded by The Reverend Buford Smith who stated that God had given him a vision to build a TV station in Virginia. The station grew from the original station in Grundy to include the other two transmitters.

Rev. Smith was pastor of Tookland Pentecostal Church in Grundy until his death in May 2003. His son, Michael Smith, was president of the station until Buford Smith's death, when he became president and CEO of Living Faith Television.

Tookland Pentecostal Church was a major financier when the station was founded; it broke most of its ties with the station after it declared its independence in 2006.

Living Faith Television is now under the control the board of Living Faith Television, with Mike Smith as president and CEO and wife Lisa Smith as CFO. Other personalities are Mary Smith (wife of the late Buford Smith), Laverne Tripp and Fred Schmidt, among others.

Programming
The station's programming consists mostly of content by other ministries that purchase air time, along with some infomercials. Original programming is spread throughout the broadcast day by the flagship program Living Faith Now! (formerly From These Hills), along with Sing Time, Fred Schmidt, and Life Begins at Calvary, a program produced by Calvary Church of the Tri-Cities, and other programs.

Technical information

Subchannels
The station's digital signal is multiplexed:

Analog-to-digital conversion
WLFG shut down its analog signal, over UHF channel 68, in May 2007. The station's digital signal remained on its pre-transition UHF channel 49. Through the use of Program and System Information Protocol, digital television receivers display the station's virtual channel as its former UHF analog channel 68, which was among the high band UHF channels (52-69) that were removed from broadcasting use as a result of the transition.

Satellite stations

Out-of-market cable carriage
In recent years, WLFG has been carried on cable in a number of areas outside the Tri-Cities media market, including cable systems within the Charleston, Lexington, Charlotte and Greensboro markets. According to Zap2it, WLFG has been carried on cable in College Grove, Tennessee, which is within the Nashville market.

Much of the southeastern portion of the Lexington media market can pick up WAGV's signal. WLFG/WAGV is also available on TVS cable in the Hazard, Kentucky area, and much of Knott and Perry counties, along with the Floyd County community of Wayland.

References

External links

Independent television stations in the United States
Religious television stations in the United States
Defy TV affiliates
Ion Television affiliates
TrueReal affiliates
True Crime Network affiliates
Quest (American TV network) affiliates
Buzzr affiliates
Decades (TV network) affiliates
GetTV affiliates
Scripps News affiliates
LFG
Television channels and stations established in 1995
1995 establishments in Virginia
Buchanan County, Virginia